"Reach for the Stars" is a song made popular by Shirley Bassey, and written by Austrian pop singer/songwriter Udo Jürgens (with English lyrics by Norman Newell). As a double A-side single (b/w "Climb Ev'ry Mountain") it went to No. 1 in the UK Singles Chart for one week in September 1961.

References

1961 songs
UK Singles Chart number-one singles
Shirley Bassey songs
Songs written by Udo Jürgens